National Museum of Natural History may refer to:
 National Museum of Natural History, Sofia, Bulgaria
 Chilean National Museum of Natural History, Santiago, Chile
 National Museum of Natural History, Havana, Cuba
 National Museum of Natural History, Paris, France
 National Museum of Natural History, New Delhi, India
 National Museum of Natural History, Luxembourg City, Luxembourg
 National Museum of Natural History, Mdina, Malta
 National Museum of Natural History, Leiden, Netherlands (1820-1984)
 Naturalis Biodiversity Center, Leiden, Netherlands
 National Museum of Natural History, Manila, Philippines
 National Museum of Natural History and Science, Lisbon, Portugal
 Grigore Antipa National Museum of Natural History, Romania
 Ditsong National Museum of Natural History, Pretoria, South Africa
 National Museum of Natural History, Colombo, Sri Lanka
 National Museum of Natural History at the National Academy of Sciences of Ukraine
 National Museum of Natural History, Washington, D.C., United States
 National Museum of Natural History, Uruguay

See also 
 Natural History Museum, London
 American Museum of Natural History
 Swedish Museum of Natural History